Kluai Phae is a tambon (subdistrict) of Mueang Lampang District, in Lampang Province, Thailand. In 2016 it had a population of 9,140 people.

Administration

Central administration
The tambon is divided into six administrative villages (mubans).

Local administration
The subdistrict is part of the town (Thesaban Mueang) Khelang Nakhon (เทศบาลเมืองเขลางค์นคร).

References

External links
Thaitambon.com on Kluai Phae

Tambon of Lampang province
Populated places in Lampang province